Barrister Nawabzada Waseem Khan Badozai is a Pakistani politician who had been a member of the Provincial Assembly of the Punjab from August 2018 till January 2023. He is also a member of Standing committee on Home Affairs and Special Committee No. 5.  His academic qualifications include BA in Politics, LLB (Hons.) UK, Associate of EU Law (City, London) & Barrister at Law (Lincoln's Inn, UK). He is an alumnus of London School of Economics (LSE) and a prominent social worker & modern agriculturist, having sound understanding in Islamic law, UN law, Foreign affairs law and laws relating to Use of Force and Armed conflicts. He has written numerous articles on criminology, sociology of law, perspectives of public policy, local governance and decentralisation and Public International law. He used to teach LLM classes in Bahaudin Zakariya University Multan as a visiting lecturer until 2006. Besides his conviction in legal realm he has a strong background in modern agriculture. He has travelled all around Europe, USA, Australia and the Far East to learn modern agricultural practices. He has also received various awards for his services in the field of modern agriculture.

Political career

He was elected to the Provincial Assembly of the Punjab as a candidate of Pakistan Tehreek-e-Insaf from Constituency PP-213 (Multan-III) in 2018 Pakistani general election.

References

Living people
Pakistan Tehreek-e-Insaf MPAs (Punjab)
Year of birth missing (living people)